Reqiuem is the third studio album by the Swedish experimental fusion band Goat, released on October 7, 2016 on Rocket Recordings. It was self-produced by the band and recorded at Parkeringshuset Studio.

Reception
Requiem received positive reviews upon its release. At Metacritic, which assigns a normalized rating out of 100 to reviews from mainstream critics, the album has received an average score of 75, based on 20 reviews, indicating "generally favourable" reviews.

Track listing

Personnel
Goat - musicians, production, recording
Maher Cissoko - kora on "Goodbye"
Henryk Lipp - mastering
Andreas Johansson - cover photograph
Chris Reeder - sleeve design

References

2016 albums
Goat (band) albums